Idol 2022 was the eighteenth season of the Swedish Idol series. The show was broadcast on TV4 and started on 22 August 2022, and then ended with a final on 25 November. Pär Lernström continued as presenter of the show with Anis Don Demina as co-presenter. The judges from the last season all returned.

Winner of this season was singer Nike Sellmar.

Competition

Elimination chart

Top 13

Top 11 - This is Me

Top 10 - Blast from the Past

Top 9 - Swedish Hits

Top 8 (first week) - Movie Night

Top 8 (second week) - Duets

Top 6 – Release Day & Judge's Choice

Top 5 – Love

Top 4 – Semifinal

Top 2 – Final: Free Choice, Da Capo & Winner's Single

References

External links
Idol at TV4

2022